The 2006 Rally Japan was the eleventh round of the 2006 World Rally Championship season. It took place between September 1–3, 2006.

Results

Special Stages
All dates and times are JST (UTC+9).

External links
 Results at eWRC.com
 Results at Jonkka's World Rally Archive

Rally Japan, 2006
Japan
Rally Japan